Sahana is an Indian Tamil-language TV series produced by K. Balachander. It is a sequel to the 1985 film Sindhu Bhairavi which Balachander directed. The first episode was aired on Jaya TV on 24 February 2003.

Cast 
 Y. G. Mahendran as JKB aka JK.Balaganapathy
 Anuradha Krishnamurthi as Sindhu
 Sulakshana as Bhairavi
 Kavya Shekar as Sahana
 Prakash Raj
 Bombay Gnanam
 Krishna as Surya 
 Kavithalaya Krishnan
 Renuka
 AR.Srinivasan
 Madhan Bob
 Delhi Ganesh
 Janakaraj
 Achamillai Gopi
 TV.Varadharajan
 Oorvambu Lakshmi
 Revathi Shankar
 Suganthi Perumal
 Shailaja
 Sri Ranjini
 Sureshwar
 Vishnu
 Rajkamal
 Mohan.V.Ram
 Master Sriram
 Hemamalini
 Preetha Raghav
 Sri Vidya
 Sonia Bose
 Giridharan

Production

Development 
Though K. Balachander had been toying with the idea of making a sequel to his 1985 film Sindhu Bhairavi for over 10 years since the early 1990s, he eventually abandoned the idea as he believed people would compare it unfavourably to the film. Near the end of the TV series Anni, produced by his company Minbimangal, he went searching for an idea for his next series and rediscovered the sequel to the film he had written years before, albeit not very diligently. The title of the series Sahana is a reference to the Carnatic raga of the same name.

Casting 
Balachander initially wanted the main cast of the film to reprise their roles in the series. Sivakumar was unable to return as JKB as he was committed to another series. Suhasini was willing to return as Sindhu, but Balachander decided on recasting. Executive Subha said, "You cannot separate JKB and Sindhu. Sir (Balachander) felt if we are going to have a different JKB, let's have a different Sindhu too". The role of JKB went to Y. G. Mahendran. He considered it a challenge to portray JKB, due to his reputation as a comedian. Balachander and his unit were initially unable to locate Sulakshana, who played Bhairavi in the film and had long since retired from acting, and decided to kill off Bhairavi. However, Sulakshana learned about the project and approached Balachander, saying she would portray Bhairavi. The script was rewritten to have her character alive. Sulakshana said, "[Bhairavi] is still the same soft person. The only difference is she is older and the mother of two children. There is more understanding between JKB and Bhairavi now -- she doesn't fight with him". Carnatic singer Anuradha Krishnamoorthy, who had never acted before, was approached by Minbimangal to portray Sindhu. She was reluctant to accept the offer, due to her lack of interest in acting. But after her husband persuaded, she met Balachander, who promised to ensure that her commitment to the series would not affect her concerts; Anuradha then agreed to the role. Newcomer Kavya Shekar was cast as the title character after one of her father's friends recommended her to Balachander.

Music 
Rajhesh Vaidhya composed the songs for the series. Carnatic singers  Balamurali krishna and Sudha Ragunathan sang the title song.While Dr.Narayanan,Saindhavi,Mahathi and others were also sang the songs.Pulamaipithan were written the all songs

Broadcast 
The first episode aired on Jaya TV on 24 February 2003.

References 

2000s Tamil-language television series
Jaya TV television series
Sequel television series